Noland "Super Gnat" Smith, Jr. (born October 20, 1943) is a former American football wide receiver/return specialist for the Kansas City Chiefs (1967–1969) in the American Football League and San Francisco 49ers (1969) in the  National Football League.

College career
Smith played college football at Tennessee A&I University (now Tennessee State University), where he set numerous school records for punt returns. He holds the school records for career punt returns (100); punt return yardage in a game (243), and season (572); career punt return yardage (1,933); highest average per punt return for a season (19.0) and a career (19.3); and most punt return touchdowns during a season (4) and a career (9).

Professional career
Known as "Super Gnat" for his short stature and light weight -- he was listed at 5-6 1/4 and 154 pounds -- he was the smallest-sized player in the AFL or NFL of his era. Smith was drafted by the Kansas City Chiefs in the sixth round of the 1967 AFL Draft. In his rookie season with the Chiefs in 1967, Smith led the American Football League in kickoff return yardage with 1,360 yards. On December 17, 1967, Smith returned a kickoff 106 yards for a touchdown, still the longest kickoff return in Kansas City Chiefs history. Smith currently ranks 18th on the NFL's all-time kick return average list with 26.06 yards per return.

During his three seasons in the AFL and the NFL with the Chiefs and 49ers, Smith was almost exclusively on kickoff and punt returns, with 63 punt returns for 635 yards and one touchdown and 82 kickoff returns for 2,137 yards and one touchdown, but only three rushing attempts for six yards, two pass receptions for 57 yards.

After football
Smith and his wife, Gloria, celebrated their 50th wedding anniversary in 2012. They have three children, Noland Jr., Tonya and Kevin, and three grandchildren, Jade, Noland III and Niqui. Smith retired in 2013 after 43 years with the city of Jackson, Mississippi Parks & Recreation Department. For 21 of those years, he was center coordinator at the Medgar Evers Community Center in Jackson.

Smith appeared as "Superbug" in the 1970 movie MASH.

References

External links
Stats

1943 births
Living people
Players of American football from Jackson, Mississippi
American football return specialists
American football wide receivers
Tennessee State Tigers football players
Kansas City Chiefs players
San Francisco 49ers players
American Football League players